Dmytro Oleksandrovych Yakovenko (born 6 May 1971) is a former Ukrainian football player.

International

He represented Ukraine national football team in a friendly against Lithuania on 18 May 1993.

Honours
 Ukrainian Premier League runner-up: 1993.

References

External links
 
 

1971 births
Living people
People from Jambyl Region
Soviet footballers
FC Taraz players
Ukrainian footballers
FC Krystal Chortkiv players
FC Dnipro players
Ukrainian Premier League players
Ukraine international footballers
FC Kryvbas Kryvyi Rih players
PFC CSKA Moscow players
Ukrainian expatriate footballers
Expatriate footballers in Russia
Russian Premier League players
FC Saturn Ramenskoye players
FC KAMAZ Naberezhnye Chelny players
FC Zhemchuzhina Sochi players
FC Atyrau players
Expatriate footballers in Kazakhstan
FC Polissya Zhytomyr players
Association football defenders
FC Spartak Kostroma players